Reg Harley (19 April 1925 – 1 February 2014) was  a former Australian rules footballer who played with South Melbourne in the Victorian Football League (VFL).

Notes

External links 		
		
		
		
		
		
		
		
1925 births		
2014 deaths		
Australian rules footballers from South Australia		
Sydney Swans players
Norwood Football Club players